Al-Mughamara (The Adventure) is a Syrian film which was released in 1974.  It was directed by the Syrian film Director Muhammad Shahin. The movie is 100 minutes long.

Plot
This film depends on history trying to give some contemporary interpretations by telling about the struggle over power between the Vizier and the Caliphate. The Vizier is trying to seek help from foreign armies to help him usurp power. One guard takes the chance and delivers his head to the Vizier so as to write a message of help to the enemies. The guard starts his adventure dreaming of wealth and beautiful slave girls. But he discovers too late that the Vizier had asked the enemy to cut the head of the message carrier. So the adventure ends with death.

Cast & Crew

Cast
 Muna Wassef
 Ahmad Addas
 Ighraa
 Oussama Al-Roumani

Crew
 Mohammad Shahine Director
 Hassan Ezziddine Director of Photography
 Adnan Salloum Editor
 Kays Al-Zoubeidi Editor
 Suheil Arafa Soundtrack (Original Score)

References

External links
The Adventure at [Damascus International Film Festival]
The Adventure or Al-mughamara at [ Arab Cinema Directory]

1974 films
Syrian drama films
Syrian black-and-white films
1970s Arabic-language films
Films directed by Muhammad Shahin